The 1914 Franklin & Marshall football team was an American football team that represented Franklin & Marshall College during the 1914 college football season. The team compiled a 6–2–1 record and outscored opponents by a total of 103 to 56. Charles Mayser was the head coach.

Schedule

References

Franklin and Marshall
Franklin & Marshall Diplomats football seasons
Franklin and Marshall football